This article lists some of the events that took place in the Netherlands in 1999.

Incumbents
Monarch: Beatrix
Prime Minister: Wim Kok

Events

 February 25: A legionellosis outbreak occurs in Bovenkarspel.
 March 25: Political party Livable Netherlands is founded.
 May 1: Marianne Vaatstra is murdered in Veenklooster
 May 22: The European Soundmix Show 1999 takes place in Amsterdam.
 June 10: The European Parliament election takes place.
 June 21: Free newspaper Spits is founded.
 July 1: The Dutch Transport Safety Board is founded.
 July 1: Europol is founded.
 September 23: A widow is murdered in her house in Deventer, this is the beginning of the Deventer murder case.
 November 1: Two laboratories merge into the Netherlands Forensic Institute.
 November 19: Wie is de Mol? was first broadcast on Dutch television.

Music

 List of Dutch Top 40 number-one singles of 1999
 Netherlands in the Eurovision Song Contest 1999

Sport

 1998–99 in Dutch football
 1999 Dutch Open (tennis)
 1999 ABN AMRO World Tennis Tournament
 1999 Heineken Trophy
 1999 World Table Tennis Championships
 1999 Amstel Gold Race
 1999 Ronde van Nederland
 1999 Dutch TT
 1999 Masters of Formula 3

See also
1999 in Dutch television

References

 
Netherlands
1990s in the Netherlands
Netherlands